The 46th National Film Awards will be presented by Ministry of Information, Bangladesh to felicitate the best of Bangladeshi films released in the calendar year 2021. The list of winners were declared on 6 January 2023.

Jury board and submissions
On 16 August 2022, the ministry formed a 13 member jury board. Jury members included Morshedul Islam, Zahid Hasan, Bhorer Kagoj, Maksud Jamil Mintu, Salma Begum Sujata, and others. 21 feature films, 17 short films and 7 documentary films released in 2021 were submitted for the National Film Awards.

Lifetime Achievement

List of winners

References

External links

National Film Awards (Bangladesh) ceremonies
2021 film awards
2023 awards in Bangladesh